This is a list of transfers that took place during the 2008 Primera División of Chile season.

Apertura 2008

Antofagasta
In:
 Eric Pino from  Cobreloa
 David Portillo from  Sportivo Trinidense
 Juan Esteban Godoy from  Everton
 Cristian Brítez from  Sol de América
 Mario Vargas from  Brown
 Rubén Darío Aguilera from  Real Potosi
Out:
 Sebastián Cobelli to  Santiago Morning
 Patricio Aguilera to  Universidad Católica
 Andrés Oroz to  Rangers
 Bruno Martelotto to  Ñublense
 Israel Campillay Released
 Giovanni Narváez to  San Marcos de Arica
 Luis Alegría to  Ñublense
 Alejandro Vásquez to  La Serena
 Cristián Morán to  Ñublense
Manager in
 Mario Véner
Manager out
 Fernando Díaz

Audax Italiano
In
 Manuel Ibarra from  Unión Española
 Renzo Yáñez from  Huachipato
 Sebastián Roco from  Necaxa
 Renato Ramos from  Tecos B
 Mario Villasanti from  Sportivo Luqueño
 Marcelo Broli from  Montevideo Wanderers
 Lucas Suárez from  Tacuarembó
 Mathias Vidangossy from  Villarreal (Loan)
Out
 Franco Di Santo to  Chelsea F.C.
 Víctor Loyola to  Santiago Morning
 Diego Scotti to  Newell's Old Boys
 Juan González to  Universidad de Chile
 Nicolás Peric to  Genclerbirligi
 Leonardo Medina to  Deportivo Pereira

Cobreloa
In
 Elvis Marecos from  Club Bolívar
 Luis Pedro Figueroa from  Banfield
 Iván Guillauma from  Cobresal
 Oscar Roberto Cornejo from  Deportivo Cali
 Rafael Celedón from  San Luis Quillota
 Francisco Prieto from  Santiago Wanderers
 Rodrigo Mannara from  Deportes Puerto Montt (Loan return)
 Fabián Benítez (Free agent)
 Gustavo Savoia from  Olmedo
Out
 Esteban Paredes to  Santiago Morning (End of Loan)
 Rodrigo Pérez to  Unión Española
 Juan Luis González to  Everton
 Felipe Flores to  Unión Española
 Fernando Meneses to  Colo-Colo
 Eric Pino to  Antofagasta
 Jean Beausejour to  O'Higgins
 Cristián Canío to  Everton
 Leandro Delgado to  Everton
 Daniel Giménez to  Chacarita Juniors
 Carlos Alzamora to  La Serena
 Luis Godoy to  Cobresal
 Cristian Ríos to  Cobresal

Cobresal
In
 Oscár Fabián Ibarra from  Ñublense
 Luis Flores Manzor from  O'Higgins
 Diego Guidi from  Everton
 Fabián Alfaro from  Deportes Copiapó
 Freddy Segura from  Universidad de Concepción
 Marco Olea from  Everton
 Cristian Ríos from  Cobreloa
 Pedro Muñoz from  Curicó Unido
 Luis Godoy from  Cobreloa
 Carlos Perlaza from  Atlético Huila
Out
 Alejandro Blanco to  Santiago Morning
 Gabriel Vargas to  Universidad de Concepción
 Iván Guillauma to  Cobreloa
 Cesar Diaz to  Deportes Melipilla

Colo-Colo
In
 Lucas Barrios from  Atlas (On Loan)
 Ricardo Rojas from  América
 Daniel González from  O'Higgins
 José Domingo Salcedo from  Racing Club de Avellaneda
 Cristobal Jorquera from  Unión Española (Loan return)
 Fernando Meneses from  Cobreloa (Loan return)
 Raúl Olivares from  Santiago Morning (Loan return)
 José Pedro Fuenzalida from  Universidad Católica
 John Jairo Castillo from  Guaros FC
 Carlos Eduardo Salazar from  Deportes Tolima
Out
 Giovanni Hernandez to  Atlético Junior
 David Henriquez to  Dorados de Sinaloa
 Miguel Aceval to  Defensor Sporting
 Rodrigo Millar to  Once Caldas
 Claudio Bieler to  LDU Quito
 David Henriquez to  Dorados de Sinaloa
 Boris González to  Universidad Católica
 Richard Leyton to  Puerto Montt (Loaned)
 Ariel Salinas to  Unión San Felipe (Loaned)
 Juan Pablo Arenas to  Deportes Melipilla (Loaned)

Deportes Concepción
In
 Daniel Pereira from  O'Higgins
 Juan José Ribera from  Universidad de Concepción
 José Soto from  Santiago Wanderers
 Nestor Bareiro from  12 de Octubre
 Jaime Rubilar from  Everton
 Horacio del Valle from  Huachipato
 César Reyes from  Colo-Colo
 Leonardo Díaz from  Huracán
 Gabriel Marra from  San Telmo
 Alvaro Lara from  Universidad Católica
 Carlos Escudero from  Deportes Copiapó
Out
 Jaison Ibarrola to  Universidad de Concepción
 Leonardo Monje to  Huachipato
 Erwin Concha to  Lota Schwager
 Raul Sanzotti to  Defensores de Belgrano
 Héctor Benítez to  Olimpia
 Clarence Acuña to  Unión Española
 Alejandro Osorio to  Ñublense
 Luis Chavarría to  Fernandez Vial
 Sebastián Montecinos to  San Marcos de Arica

Everton
In
 Jaime Riveros from  Huachipato
 Mauricio Arias from  Huachipato
 Claudio Núñez from  Tigres los Mochis
 Cristián Oviedo from  Lota Schwager
 Leandro Delgado from  Cobreloa
 Roberto Silva from  Lota Schwager
 Ángel Rojas from  Universidad de Chile
 Cristián Canío from  Cobreloa
 Gustavo Tejería from  Cerro Largo
 Juan Luis González from  Cobreloa
 Fernando Saavedra from  La Serena
 Ezequiel Miralles from  Talleres de Córdoba
 Adrián Rojas from  O'Higgins
Out
 Matías Urbano to  Cúcuta Deportivo
 Alejandro Escalona Unattached
 Marco Olea to  Cobresal
 Camilo Rozas Unattached
 Jaime Rubilar to  Deportes Concepción
 Patricio Pérez to  San Martín de Tucumán
 Joel Reyes to  Ñublense
 Juan Esteban Godoy to  Antofagasta
 Samuel Teuber to  Provincial Osorno
 Diego Guidi to  La Serena
 Michael Barrientos to  Fernandez Vial
 Felipe Soto Unattached

Huachipato
In
 Henry Lapczyk from  Olimpia
 Leonardo Monje from  Deportes Concepción
 José Carlos Burgos from  12 de Octubre
 Gustavo Semino from  Gimnasia y Esgrima de La Plata
 Hernán Madrid from  Antofagasta
 Victor Hugo Sarabia from  Lota Schwager
 Roberto Cartes from  Deportes Concepción
 Gamadiel García from  Skoda Xanthi F.C.
 César Cortés from  Albacete Balompié
 Sebastian Matos from  Chacarita Juniors
Out
 Leonardo Mas to  Universidad de Chile
 José Contreras to  Universidad de Chile
 Diego Ruiz to  CFR Cluj
 Jaime Riveros to  Everton
 Cristian Leiva to  Antofagasta
 Mauricio Arias to  Everton
 Renzo Yáñez to  Audax Italiano

La Serena
In:
 Martín Gianfelice from  Comunicaciones
 Roberto Castillo from  Antofagasta
 Jonathan Domínguez from  San Lorenzo
 Yerson Opazo from  Universidad de Chile

Out:
 Fernando Saavedra from  Everton
 Patricio Rubina from  Universidad de Concepción

Melipilla
In
 Norberto Arrieta from  Almirante Brown
 Hector Barra from  O'Higgins
 Luis Oyarzún from  Coquimbo Unido
 César Díaz from  Cobresal
 Iván Alvarez from  Puerto Montt
 Carlos Espinosa from  Örgryte IS
 Vladimir Hererra from  Lota Schwager
Out
 Héctor Pericás to  Palestino
 César Henríquez to  América de Cali
 Román Cuello to  Inter Baku
 José Carlo Fernández  to  Blomming
 Diego de Gregorio to  CS Pandurii Târgu Jiu
 Carlos de Castro to  Miramar Misiones

Ñublense
In
 Ever Cantero from  Palestino
 Alejandro Osorio from  Deportes Concepción
 Alexis Norambuena from  Unión Española
 Luis Alegría from  Antofagasta
 Fernando Lopéz from  O'Higgins
 Juan Pablo Toro from  Universidad de Concepción
 César Bravo from  PSPS Pekanbaru
 Bruno Martelotto from  Antofagasta
 Jaime Bravo from  Unión Española
 Jonathan Cisternas from  Coquimbo Unido
 Cristián Morán from  Antofagasta
 Mauricio Cataldo from  Lota Schwager
 Pedro Rivera from  Coquimbo Unido
Out
 Chase Hilgenbrinck to  New England Revolution
 Manuel Villalobos to  Universidad de Chile
 Oscar Fabián Ibarra to  Cobresal
 Carlos Cisternas to  Universidad de Concepción
 Marco Millape to  Universidad de Concepción
 Danilo Aceval to  Deportes Concepción
 Luis Jara to  Universidad Católica

O'Higgins
In

Out

Palestino
In

Out

Provincial Osorno
In

Out

Rangers
In

Out

Santiago Morning
In

Out

Unión Española
In

Out

Universidad Católica
In

Out

Universidad de Chile
In
 Manuel Villalobos from  Ñublense
 Walter Montillo from  San Lorenzo
 Raúl Estévez from  Academica de Coimbra
 Leonardo Mas from  Huachipato
 José Contreras from  Huachipato
 Juan González from  Audax Italiano
Out
 Waldo Ponce to  Velez Sarsfield
 Yerson Opazo to  La Serena
 Sebastián Pinto to  Santos
 Ángel Rojas  to  Everton
 Javier Delgado to  Deportivo Cali
 Patricio Galaz Released
 Francisco Arrué to  Atlético Nacional
 Robin Melo to  Unión La Calera
 Miguel Coronado to  Unión La Calera
 Joel Soto to  Santiago Wanderers

Universidad de Concepción
In

Out

Clausura 2008

Antofagasta
In
 Gerson Acevedo from  Colo-Colo (On Loan)
 Julio Pablo Rodríguez from  Alki Larnaca FC
 César Reyes from  Colo-Colo (On Loan)
 Omar Riquelme from  Unión Española
 Rubén Bascuñán from  Unión Española
 Juan Pablo Farfán from  Alianza Lima
 Federico Martinez from  Rosario Central
 Nestor Isasi from  Alianza Lima
Out
 Mario Daniel Vargas Released
 Juan Esteban Godoy to  Silvio Pettirossi
 Héctor Suazo to  San Luis Quillota
 Cristian Leiva to  Unión San Felipe
 Eduardo Arancibia to  Santiago Morning
 Patricio Aguilera to  Universidad Católica (Loan return)
 Rubén Darío Aguilera to  Silvio Pettirossi

Audax Italiano
In
 Johnny Herrera from  Everton
 Juan González from  Universidad de Chile (On Loan)
 Omar Enrique Mallea from  Rangers de Talca
 Rubén Darío Gigena from  Sportivo Luqueño
 Fernando Gutiérrez from  Unión Española (loan return)
 Mauricio Salazar from  La Serena
Out
 Mathias Vidangossy to  CD Everton
 Sebastián Roco to  Gimnasia y Esgrima de Jujuy
 Nicolás Corvetto to  Udinese Calcio
 Carlos Villanueva to  Blackburn Rovers (Loaned)

Cobreloa
In
 Paolo Vivar (Free agent)
 Felipe Salinas from  San Luis Quillota
 Paulo Magalhaes from  Antofagasta
 Alonso Zúñiga from  Deportes Concepción
 Daniel González from  Colo-Colo (loan)
Out:
 Elvis Marecos to  Club Guarani
 Rodrigo Viligron to  Provincial Osorno
 Luis Pedro Figueroa to  Cobreloa
 Rodrigo Rain to  Coquimbo Unido

Cobresal
In

Out
 Julio César Laffatigue to  Universidad de Concepción
 Juan Manuel Lucero to  Club Olimpia

Colo-Colo
In
 Macnelly Torres from  Cúcuta Deportivo
 Daud Gazale from  Deportes Concepción
 Gerardo Cortés from  Deportes Concepción
 Juan Gonzalo Lorca from  Vitesse Arnhem
 Luis Pedro Figueroa from  Cobreloa
 Rodrigo Millar from  Once Caldas
Out
 José Luis Cabión to  Everton
 John Jairo Castillo to  Everton
 Eduardo Rubio to  FC Basel
 Carlos Eduardo Salazar to  Deportivo Pereira
 Gerardo Cortés from  Deportes Concepción
 Gustavo Biscayzacu to  Club Necaxa
 José Pedro Fuenzalida to  O'Higgins
 Rafael Caroca to  O'Higgins
 Daniel González to  Cobreloa (loan)
 Fernando Meneses to  Universidad de Concepción (loan)
 Boris Sagredo to  Palestino (loan)
 Gonzalo Fierro to  Flamengo

Deportes Concepción
In

Out
 Leonardo Díaz  Boca Unidos
 Gabriel Marra Released
 Daniel Pereira to  Universidad de Concepción
 Juan José Ribera to  Ñublense
 Nestor Bareiro to  O'Higgins
 Francisco Castillo to  Unión Española
 César Vergara to  Unión Española
 Gerardo Cortés to  Unión Española

Everton
In
 Paulo Garcés from  Universidad Católica (On Loan)
 José Luis Cabión from  Colo-Colo
 John Jairo Castillo from  Colo-Colo
 Mathias Vidangossy from  Audax Italiano (On loan from Villarreal)
 Jesús Toscanini from  Miramar Misiones
 Sebastián Tagliabué from  Club Atlético Colegiales
Out
 Claudio Núñez Retired
 Johnny Herrera to  Audax Italiano
 Javier Menghini to  Enosis Neon Paralimni FC
 Gustavo Tejería to  Atenas de San Carlos
 Darío Gigena to  Nueva Chicago

Huachipato
In
 Miguel Aceval from  Defensor Sporting
 Patricio Ormazabal from  Universidad Católica
 Mauricio Zenteno from  Universidad Católica (On Loan)
Out
 David Cid to  Unión Temuco
 Sebastian Matos to  Atlanta FC
 Carlos Rivera to  Deportes Temuco
 Herminio Miranda to  Club Nacional
 Gustavo Semino to  Unión La Calera

La Serena
In
 Gustavo Canales from  Once Caldas
 Patricio Rubina from  Universidad de Concepción
 Pablo Bolados from  Cobreloa
 Carlos Alzamora from  Cobreloa
 Luis Peña from  Unión San Felipe
 Alejandro Vázquez (Free agent)
Out
 Mauricio Salazar to  Audax Italiano

Melipilla
In
 Javier Dussan from  Academia FC
 Juan Pablo Arenas from  Colo-Colo
 Juan Cruz Gill from  Talleres de Córdoba
 Franco Arias from  Quilmes AC
 Ricardo Hernán Pagés (Free agent)
Out
 Cristián Muñoz Corrales to  José Gálvez FBC
 Hector Barra to  Curicó Unido
 John Valladares to  San Luis Quillota
 Alejandro Carrasco to  Palestino
 Jaime García from  Lota Schwager

Ñublense
In
 Patricio Galaz from  Millonarios
 Juan José Ribera from  Deportes Concepción
 Fernando Martel from  Atlético Nacional
 Matías Rojas from  Villa Dalmine
Out

O'Higgins
In
 Aílton da Silva from  Universidad Católica
 Nestor Bareiro from  Deportes Concepción
 Jose Pedro Fuenzalida from  Colo-Colo (On Loan)
 Rafael Caroca from  Colo-Colo (On Loan)
 Ali Manouchehri from  Antofagasta
 Jean Beausejour from  América (On Loan)
Out
 Felipe Flores Quijada to  Coquimbo Unido
 Roberto Cáceres to  Lobos de la BUAP
 Jean Beausejour to  América
 Carlos Carmona to  Reggina

Palestino
In
 Ernesto Sinclair from  Estudiantes de La Plata
 Alejandro Carrasco from  Deportes Melipilla
 Boris Sagredo from  Colo-Colo (On Loan)
Out
 Juan Carlos Maldonado to  Coquimbo Unido
 Juan Pablo Úbeda to  Lobos de la BUAP

Provincial Osorno
In
 Marco Millape from  Universidad de Concepción
 Ricardo Parada from  Lobos de la BUAP
 Claudio Muñoz from  UA Maracaibo
 Santiago Gentiletti from  Gimnasia y Esgrima de La Plata (On Loan)
 Rodrigo Viligrón from  Cobreloa
Out
 Diego Casamán to  Villa Española
 Michael Silva to  Potros Chetumal
 Gonzalo Sepulveda to  Universidad Católica (End of Loan)
 José Pablo Burtovoy to  Jorge Wilstermann
 Emerson Ayala to  Deportes Temuco
 Héctor Federico Carballo to  Guaraní
 Fernando Brandán Released
 Fabián Caballero to  Panachaiki Patras

Rangers
In
 Juan Manuel Cavallo from  Tiro Federal
 Marcelo Soto from  Magallanes
 Jorge Aquino from  Curicó Unido
 Matías Lavanderos from  Linares CF
Out
 Lucas Palma to  Municipal Iquique
 Derlis Ortellado to  Municipal Iquique
 Omar Enrique Mallea to  Audax Italiano
 Nahuel Jiménez to  Platense

Santiago Morning
In
 Diego Rivarola from  Alki Larnaca
 Carlos Javier Netto from  Gimnasia y Esgrima
 Jaime Grondona from  Santiago Wanderers
 Eduardo Arancibia from  Antofagasta
 Eduardo Dumas from  Unión San Felipe
Out
 José Catalan to  San Luis Quillota
 Miguel Catalán Released
 Luis Valenzuela to  Deportes Temuco
 Sebastián Cobelli to  Talleres de Córdoba
 Juan Ramón Orellana to  Unión La Calera
 Juan Pablo Arenas to  Deportes Melipilla
 Marco Moscoso to  San Marcos de Arica
 Wladimir Lopéz Released
 Sergio Cáceres Released
 Fernando Abarca Released

Unión Española
In
 Gerardo Cortés from  Colo-Colo (On Loan)
 Angel Vildozo from  CSD Comunicaciones
 Héctor Joel Pérez from  Silvio Pettirossi
 Nelson López from  Silvio Pettirossi
 Jaime Rubilar from  Deportes Concepción
 César Vergara from  Deportes Concepción
 Francisco Castillo from  Deportes Concepción
 Anibal Domeneghini from  Unión San Felipe
Out
 Osvaldo Barsottini to  C.A.I
 Mario Cáceres to  FC St Gallen
 Cristián Sepulveda to  Municipal Iquique (Loaned)
 Omar Riquelme to  Antofagasta
 Ruben Bascuñán to  Antofagasta
 Fernando Gutiérrez to  Audax Italiano (End of Loan)

Universidad Católica
In
 Gonzalo Sepúlveda from  Provincial Osorno (Loan Return)
 Patricio Aguilera from  Antofagasta (Loan Return)
 Jaison Ibarrola from  Universidad de Concepción
 Nicolás Gianni from  Argentinos Juniors (On loan)
 Milovan Mirosevic from  Argentinos Juniors
 Jeremias Caggiano from  Albacete Balompié
Out
 Darío Bottinelli to  Atlas
 Mauricio Zenteno to  Huachipato (Loaned)
 Patricio Ormazabal to  Huachipato
 Roberto Gutiérrez to  Tecos
 Nicolás Núñez to  Albacete Balompié (End of Loan)
 Hector Tapia Released
 Carlos Arías to  Provincial Osorno
 Aílton da Silva to  O'Higgins

Universidad de Chile
In
 Osvaldo González from  Universidad de Concepción
 Sebastián Pardo from  Excelsior Rotterdam
 Nelson Pinto from  UAG Tecos (On Loan)
 Cristián Milla from  Chacarita Juniors
Out
 Juan González to  Audax Italiano
 Pedro Morales to  Dinamo Zagreb
 Eduardo Navea to  Santiago Wanderers
 Cristobal López to  Santiago Wanderers

Universidad de Concepción
In
 Julio César Laffatigue from  Cobresal
 Fernando Meneses from  Colo-Colo (On Loan)
 Daniel Pereira from  Deportes Concepción
 Carlos Zorrilla from  12 de Octubre
Out
 Jaison Ibarrola to  Universidad Católica
 Osvaldo González to  Universidad de Chile
 Marco Millape to  Provincial Osorno
 Carlos Cisternas to  Puerto Montt
 Hugo Bascuñán to  Santiago Wanderers
 Patricio Rubina to  La Serena
 Hector Tapia Vega Released
 Iván Valenzuela Released

Transfers
2008